Kamilari is a village on the island of Crete, Greece, with 379 inhabitants. There is an archaeological site of an ancient Minoan cemetery nearby. The origin of the name 'Kamilari' is Byzantine. It is derived from the word 'kamilaris' or ‘Καμηλάρης’ meaning 'the one who rides a camel' Original owners of the name Kamilari live in Cyprus as Catholic Maronites and are quite active with investments and activities in the area of ​​Kamilari.

Kamilari is built atop three hills:
 Ovgora, meaning "good view" is the highest one with an altitude of 110m, 
 Goulas is the one with the old school and the Hellenistic findings on top and  
 Alevrota, reachable from the village exit in direction of Sivas. 
The village and the surrounding places can also be visited via the virtual tour.

Archaeology 
The Minoan tholos tomb is on a low hill 1.9 kilometers southwest of Hagia Triada. East of the tomb were five rooms, probably added during Middle Minoan IIIA, and an area for offerings north of these rooms.  Here, 500 vases were found upside down.  Another 250 vases were found inside the tholos tomb.

Three clay models were found in the Late Minoan IIIA burials.  One is of a group of dancers, another is two people standing in front of four seated people, and the third is of a banquet including the Minoan horns "of consecration" and doves.  These artefacts are on display at the Heraklion Archaeological Museum.

Village amenities 
There are numerous villas and rooms to rent. There is a supermarket with a traditional butcher's shop. Fairs are held during the feast-days of the village on 27 July and 6 August.

References

External links 
Minoan Crete Kamilari page, Ian Swindale
Cultural committee of Kamilari webpage
A Kamilari website for the village and the surrounding places
Kamilari and surrounding areas virtual tour

Minoan sites in Crete
Ancient cemeteries in Greece
Populated places in Heraklion (regional unit)
Beehive tombs